North Stormont is a lower tier township in eastern Ontario, Canada in the United Counties of Stormont, Dundas and Glengarry.

Communities
The township of North Stormont comprises a number of villages and hamlets, including the following communities:

 Finch Township: Berwick, Crysler, Finch; Cahore, Goldfield, Glenpayne
 Roxborough Township: Avonmore, Monkland, Moose Creek, Roxborough Gardens, Bloomington, Dyer, Gravel Hill, Lodi, MacDonalds Grove, McMillans Corners (partially), Sandringham, Strathmore, Tayside, Tolmies Corners, Warina, Valley Corners

The township administrative offices are located in Berwick.

History

Early settlement in the area began in 1785 Finch Township was originally part of the Royal Township of Osnabruck, and Roxborough Township was originally part of the Royal Township of Cornwall. Stormont County was created in 1792, and both Finch and Roxborough were separated from their southerly parents in 1798.

The hamlet of Berwick was first settled by four Cockburn brothers from Scotland in the early 19th century. Berwick became the administrative home of municipal government in the former Finch Township, incorporated January 1, 1850.

The New York and Ottawa Railway was built in 1897 and sent up to four daily passenger trains, as well as up to five daily freight trains through Berwick.  The first church was built in 1883.

The township was established on January 1, 1998, with the amalgamation of the former Townships of Finch and Roxborough, along with the Village of Finch.

Demographics 

Railways
Crysler is represented by a signpost on the Canadian National Railway line between Montreal and Toronto.

See also
List of townships in Ontario
List of francophone communities in Ontario

References

External links 

Lower-tier municipalities in Ontario
Municipalities in the United Counties of Stormont, Dundas and Glengarry
Township municipalities in Ontario